Eugene S. Callender (January 21, 1926 – November 2, 2013) was an American pastor and activist in the Civil Rights Movement.

Callender was born in Cambridge, Massachusetts, and studied at Cambridge Rindge and Latin School and Boston University, before becoming the first African American to study at Westminster Theological Seminary. He later studied at New York Law School.

For most of his life, Callender lived and worked in Harlem. He was the first black ordained minister in the Christian Reformed Church in North America (CRCNA), and also served as deputy administrator of the New York City Housing and Development Administration.

References

1926 births
2013 deaths
American Presbyterian ministers
Activists for African-American civil rights
Boston University alumni
Westminster Theological Seminary alumni
New York Law School alumni
People from Cambridge, Massachusetts
Cambridge Rindge and Latin School alumni
African-American Christian clergy
20th-century African-American people
21st-century African-American people